Olympe Bhêly-Quénum (born 20 September 1928) is a Beninese writer, journalist and magazine editor. He is the nephew of anthropologist Maximilien Quenum-Possy-Berry.

Born in Ouidah, Benin (formerly Dahomey), Bhêly-Quénum had his primary education in Benin from 1938 to 1944, after which he traveled throughout his native country, Nigeria, his maternal grandmother's country, and Ghana, where he learned English. In 1948 he went to France and undertook his secondary studies at the College Littré, in Avranches, Normandy (Manche). He worked as a teacher and trained as a diplomat, before turning to journalism. He was Editor-in-Chief and then Director of an African magazine entitled La Vie Africaine until 1964. He subsequently joined UNESCO in Paris.

He is the author of several works of fiction published in French. He won the Grand prix littéraire d'Afrique noire for Le Chant du lac in 1966. His first novel Un Piège Sans Fin (1960) was translated into English as Snares Without End (Longman, 1981) and has been called "an un-put-downable tragedy".

Works
 Un Piège Sans Fin (Stock, 1960; 1978). Translated by Dorothy S. Blair as Snares Without End (Longman, 1981) 
 Le Chant du lac (Editions Présence Africaine)
 Liaison d'un été et autres récits (1968)
 L'initié (1979)
 Les Mille Haches (1981)
 Les Francs-Maçons (1997)
 La naissance d’Abikou ("Abikou's birth", 1998)

Further reading
 Willfried Feuser, "Representations of childhood in Olympe Bhely-Quenum's works", Présence Africaine, no. 155, 1er semestre 1997.

References

External links
 Olympe Bhely-Quenum's website
 Claude Wauthier, Un auteur à découvrir: Olympe Bhely-Quenum entre l’Europe et l’Afrique, Chronique Livres, Radio France Internationale, 13 August 2003 – review in French

1928 births
Living people
People of French West Africa
Beninese journalists
Beninese novelists
People from Ouidah
20th-century novelists
Male novelists
Male journalists
20th-century male writers
Weird fiction writers